Harpalus or Harpalos is a name reported by modern historical books (tertiary sources) as the engineer who built the pontoon bridge over the Hellespont (from Abydos to Sestos) for  Xerxes in 480 BC. The primary source Herodotus  (7.34-36)  gives no specific name, except the following information: 

The secondary source may have been some later writer, who may have invented a name in order to provide a name for this impressive engineering achievement, in the manner of Mandrocles, recorded by Herodotus as bridging the Bosporus for Darius I. The oldest and relevant source seems to be a work published in 1904 by Hermann Alexander Diels which he titled Laterculi Alexandrini ("Alexandrian lists"), out of a damaged 1st or 2nd-century BC papyrus he found, which lists artists and scientists by their achievements.

The tertiary sources report the following: One of Mandrocles' successors, not named by Herodotus (7.34-36), was Harpalos of Tenedos who, succeeding where Egyptian and Phoenician engineers had failed, built the bridge over the Hellespont (Hofstetter 1978, no. 130; on the bridge, see Hammond and Roseman 1996). It is important for a right estimate of Ionian science to remember the high development of engineering in these days. Mandrokles of Samos built the bridge over the Bosporos for King Dareios (Herod. iv. 88), and Harpalos of Tenedos bridged the Hellespont for Xerxes when the Egyptians and Phoenicians had failed in the attempt (Diels, Laterculi Alexandrini,  Abh. der Berl. Akad., 1904, p. 8). Harpalus, a Macedonian contractor, who took on the bridging project, according to Peter Green. The astronomer Harpalus supervised the construction of the bridges. according to Hugh Pembroke Vowles.

References

People of the Greco-Persian Wars
Ancient Greek engineers
Achaemenid Thrace